Ninne Pelladata is a 1996 Indian Telugu-language romantic family drama film, produced by Nagarjuna under the Annapurna Studios banner and directed by Krishna Vamsi. It stars Nagarjuna and Tabu, and music composed by Sandeep Chowta. The film was remade in Kannada as Preethsod Thappa. The film has received the National Film Award for Best Feature Film in Telugu for that year. This film recorded as "Industry Hit" at box office.

Plot

Ninne Pelladata is family romance based movie in which Mahalakshmi comes to Hyderabad for flight training and falls in love with Seenu. The duo decide to inform their respective parents of their plan to get married. Seenu's family welcomes Mahalakshmi, and approves of her. Just shortly after their approval, Mahalakshmi's parents interrupt the proceedings and forcibly take Mahalaxmi with them, to get her married to someone else, leaving Mahalakshmi and Seenu to an unknown fate.

Cast

Soundtrack

The music was composed by Sandeep Chowta. Music released on T-Series Audio Company.

Unnaiye Kalyaanam Pannikkiren (Tamil Version)

Production
In the words of Vamsi:

Meena was initially offered the role of Tabu, but she was unable to adjust the dates, the crew searched for other options

Box office 
 The film had a successful 100-day run in 39 centres.
 The film had a 175-day run in 4 centres.
 Its dubbed version in Tamil, Unnaiye Kalyanam Pannikiren was also a super hit.
 Its Remake version in Kannada, Preethsod Thappa starring V. Ravichandran and Shilpa Shetty was also a super hit.
Its collected total 12.3 cr shares in total run.

Accolades

Notes

References

External links
 

1996 films
1990s Telugu-language films
Indian romantic drama films
Indian romantic musical films
Telugu films remade in other languages
Films directed by Krishna Vamsi
Films scored by Sandeep Chowta
Films set in Hyderabad, India
Best Telugu Feature Film National Film Award winners
1996 romantic drama films
1990s romantic musical films
Films shot in the Maldives